Rhinophis erangaviraji, also known commonly as Eranga Viraj's shieldtail snake, is a species of snake in the family Uropeltidae. The species is endemic to Sri Lanka, where it was discovered in the Rakwana area of Matara District.

Habitat

Description
The species R. erangaviraji is easily distinguished from other shieldtails in Sri Lanka through color variations. The head is black, with yellow irregular spots. The eyes are black. The body is black dorsally, with some yellow irregular patches. The ventral surface is cream-colored, with a stripe running along the vent region. The tail shield is black with small spines on it, which help to gather sand particles. Juveniles are similar to adults, but with a darker head and a paler body.

Behavior

Reproduction
Mating of R. erangaviraji may occur during July and August, as juveniles can be seen from October to January.

Etymology
The specific name, erangaviraji, is in honor of Sri Lankan zoologist Eranga Viraj Dayarathne, who was an Instructor of the Reptiles group of the Young Zoologists’ Association of Sri Lanka, and Department of National Zoological Gardens.

References

Further reading
McDiarmid RW, Campbell JA, Touré TA (2009). Snake Species of the World: A Taxonomic and Geographic Reference, vol. 1. Washington, District of Columbia: Herpetologists' League. 511 pp.  (series),  (volume).
Pyron RA, Ganesh SR, Sayyed A, Sharma V, Wallach V, Somaweera R (2016). "A catalogue and systematic overview of the shield-tailed snakes (Serpentes: Uropeltidae)". Zoosystema 38 (4): 453–506.
Pyron RA, Kandambi HKD, Hendry CR, Pushpamal V, Burbrink FT, Somaweera R (2013). "Genus-level phylogeny of snakes reveals the origin of species richness in Sri Lanka". Molecular Phylogenetics and Evolution 66 (3): 969–978.
Wickramasinghe LJM, Vidanapathirana DR, Wickramasinghe N, Ranwella PN (2009). "A new species of Rhinophis Hemprich, 1820 (Reptilia: Serpentes: Uropeltidae) from Rakwana massif, Sri Lanka". Zootaxa 2004: 1–22. (Rhinophis erangaviraji, new species).

External links
https://www.biolib.cz/en/taxon/id731126/

erangaviraji
Snakes of Asia
Reptiles of Sri Lanka
Endemic fauna of Sri Lanka
Reptiles described in 2009
Taxa named by Mendis Wickramasinghe